The 1981–82 SK Rapid Wien season was the 84th season in club history.

Squad

Squad and statistics

Squad statistics

Fixtures and results

League

Cup

UEFA Cup

References

1981-82 Rapid Wien Season
Rapid
Austrian football championship-winning seasons